Balaana is a genus of flies belonging to the family Bombyliidae (bee-flies). There are about seven described species, including three from western Australia.

Species
These 11 species belong to the genus Balaana:
 Balaana abscondita Lambkin & Yeates, 2003
 Balaana bicuspis Lambkin & Yeates, 2003
 Balaana centrosa Lambkin & Yeates, 2003
 Balaana efflatounbeyi (Paramonov, 1928)
 Balaana gigantea Lambkin & Yeates, 2003
 Balaana grandis (Wiedemann, 1820)
 Balaana kingcascadensis Lambkin & Yeates, 2003
 Balaana latelimbata (Bigot, 1892)
 Balaana obliquebifasciata (Macquart, 1850)
 Balaana onusta (Walker, 1852)
 Balaana tamerlan (Portschinsky, 1887)

References

Bombyliidae
Diptera of Australasia
Bombyliidae genera